The Sierra de Santa Rosa Formation is a geologic formation in Mexico. It preserves fossils dating back to the Jurassic period.

See also

 List of fossiliferous stratigraphic units in Mexico

References
 

Jurassic Mexico